Elvin Oscar Butcher (February 9, 1907 – June 6, 1957) was a college football and basketball player for the Tennessee Volunteers of the University of Tennessee.

University of Tennessee

Football
Butcher was a prominent football player for Robert Neyland's Tennessee Volunteers from 1925 to 1928. Butcher was selected for a 1920s All-Tennessee football team.

1927
Butcher was selected All-Southern at the center position in 1927. His play against Vanderbilt helped secure the spot, as he outplayed Vandy center Vernon Sharpe, who arguably had the better season. One of the All-Southern teams was to face an all-star squad of Pacific Coast players, and as a result the basketball team took a significant hit from the loss of its captain Butcher.

References

American football centers
Tennessee Volunteers football players
All-Southern college football players
Tennessee Volunteers basketball players
1907 births
Basketball players from Knoxville, Tennessee
Players of American football from Knoxville, Tennessee
1957 deaths
American men's basketball players